The 1994 Rhythmic Gymnastics European Championships is the 10th edition of the Rhythmic Gymnastics European Championships, which took place from 26 May to 29 May 1994 in Thessaloniki, Greece.

Medal winners

Medal table

References 

1994 in gymnastics
Rhythmic Gymnastics European Championships